The Cyprus Union of Bank Employees (ETYK) is a trade union centre in Cyprus. It is affiliated with the Union Network International.

References

External links
www.etyk.org.cy

Trade unions in Cyprus
UNI Global Union
Finance sector trade unions
Trade unions established in 1955
1955 establishments in Cyprus